Korey Cunningham  (born May 17, 1995) is an American football offensive tackle for the New York Giants of the National Football League (NFL). He played college football at Cincinnati.

College career
Cunningham played in 33 games, starting 24 as a left tackle for Cincinnati.

Professional career

Arizona Cardinals
Cunningham was drafted by the Arizona Cardinals in the seventh round (254th overall) of the 2018 NFL Draft. On May 11, 2018, he signed his rookie contract. He started his first career regular-season game in Week 11 against the Oakland Raiders at left tackle in place of an injured D. J. Humphries, and started there the next six games. He suffered a foot injury in Week 16 and was placed on injured reserve on December 25, 2018.

New England Patriots
On August 28, 2019, Cunningham was traded to the New England Patriots for a 2020 sixth-round pick.

On August 31, 2021, Cunningham was released by the Patriots.

New York Giants
On September 7, 2021, Cunningham was signed to the New York Giants practice squad. On October 19, 2021, Cunningham was signed to the active roster.

On March 17, 2022, the Giants re-signed Cunningham. On July 22, 2022, his contract was terminated with a non-football injury. On October 18, 2022, the New York Giants signed Cunningham to their practice squad. On November 23, 2022, Cunningham was elevated from the practice squad for week 12 game against the Dallas Cowboys. He signed a reserve/future contract on January 22, 2023.

References

External links
Cincinnati Bearcats bio
Patriots bio

1995 births
Living people
American football offensive tackles
Arizona Cardinals players
Cincinnati Bearcats football players
New England Patriots players
New York Giants players
People from Montevallo, Alabama
Players of American football from Alabama